Albert Marshall may refer to:

 Albert Marshall (veteran) (1897–2005), British veteran of the First World War and the last surviving British cavalryman to have seen battle on the Western Front
 Albert Marshall (American football), American football coach
 A. L. Marshall (Albert L. Marshall), American football player and coach
 Bert Marshall (born 1943), retired Canadian ice hockey defenceman
 Albert Marshall (author), Maltese poet and author
 A. P. Marshall (Albert P. Marshall), American librarian and educator
 Albert Marshall (naval officer), American naval officer and aviator; see

See also
Bertie Marshall, musician
Bertie Marshall (cricketer)